Nataliia Lagutenko is a Ukrainian Paralympic canoeist. She competed in the paracanoeing competition at the 2016 Summer Paralympics, winning the silver medal in the women's KL2 event. Lagutenko also competed at the 2020 Summer Paralympics.

References

External links 
Paralympic Games profile

Living people
Place of birth missing (living people)
Year of birth missing (living people)
Ukrainian female canoeists
Paracanoeists of Ukraine
Paracanoeists at the 2016 Summer Paralympics
Medalists at the 2016 Summer Paralympics
Paracanoeists at the 2020 Summer Paralympics
Paralympic medalists in paracanoe
Paralympic silver medalists for Ukraine